Antonis Karabinas (born 12 January 1998) is a Greek professional footballer who plays as a left-back for Atromitos Palama.

References

1998 births
Living people
Greek footballers
Greek expatriate footballers
Super League Greece players
Kategoria Superiore players
Football League (Greece) players
Gamma Ethniki players
Athlitiki Enosi Larissa F.C. players
Anagennisi Karditsa F.C. players
Apollon Larissa F.C. players
Luftëtari Gjirokastër players
Association football defenders
Footballers from Larissa